James de Rothschild may refer to:
 James de Rothschild (politician) (1878–1957), French-born British politician and philanthropist
 James Mayer de Rothschild (1792–1868), German-French banker

See also
Rothschild family